The regular season of the 2018–19 NBL season, the 41st season of the National Basketball League (NBL). It started on 11 October 2018 and finished on 17 February 2019. Eight teams participated, with the top four advancing to the finals series.

Games

Round 1

Round 2

Round 3

Round 4

Round 5

Round 6

Round 7

Round 8

Round 9

Round 10

Round 11

Round 12

Round 13

Round 14

Round 15

Round 16

Round 17

Round 18

Source:

Ladder 

The NBL tie-breaker system as outlined in the NBL Rules and Regulations states that in the case of an identical win-loss record, the overall points percentage between the teams will determine order of seeding.

1Perth Wildcats won on overall points percentage. Melbourne United finished 2nd on overall points percentage. 

2Brisbane Bullets won on overall points percentage. 

3New Zealand Breakers won on overall points percentage.

References

External links

 

regular season
2018–19 in Australian basketball